Saghmosavan is a village in the Ashtarak Municipality of the Aragatsotn Province of Armenia.  The town is the site of the Saghmosavank Monastery (the "Monastery of Psalms") with Saint Sion church, built in 1215.

Demographics 
Population change:

References

Populated places in Aragatsotn Province
Yazidi populated places in Armenia